Nepean Woods station is located in the Ottawa, Ontario, Canada suburb of Barrhaven, and is on the Southwest Transitway which is served by OC Transpo buses. Located near the intersection of Woodroffe Avenue and Strandherd Drive in southern Nepean, it was the westerly terminus of most trips of rapid-transit route 74, formerly numbered route 94. It is also the site of a  park and ride lot for residents of Barrhaven, which opened on 24 February 2014.

In July 19, 2014, selected trips on route 74 (then 94) were extended to/from Riverview Station via the then-newly opened Vimy Memorial Bridge. Route 99 has selected trips extended via the bridge and Nepean Woods Station to/from Barrhaven Centre Station. On June 20, 2021, Route 74 changed its routing to again terminate at Nepean Woods.

Service

The following routes serve Nepean Woods station as of June 20 2021:*

 Some PM trips from Merivale High School on route  travel west of Nepean Woods towards Barrhaven Centre instead of east towards Riverside South via Riverview station.
 One PM trip on route  from Merivale High School travels east towards Riverside South via Riverview station instead of west towards Barrhaven Centre.

References

External links
 OC Transpo - Routes & Maps - Route 94
 OC Transpo - Routes & Maps - Route 99
 OC Transpo - Routes & Maps - Route 176

2013 establishments in Ontario
Transitway (Ottawa) stations